Nabi Gul (born 5 October 1997) is a Pakistani cricketer. He made his List A debut for Khyber Pakhtunkhwa in the 2017 Pakistan Cup on 17 April 2017. He made his Twenty20 debut for Federally Administered Tribal Areas in the 2017–18 National T20 Cup on 22 November 2017. He made his first-class debut for Peshawar in the 2018–19 Quaid-e-Azam Trophy on 11 October 2018.

In September 2019, he was named in Khyber Pakhtunkhwa's squad for the 2019–20 Quaid-e-Azam Trophy tournament.

References

External links
 

1997 births
Living people
Pakistani cricketers
Khyber Pakhtunkhwa cricketers
Federally Administered Tribal Areas cricketers
Peshawar cricketers
Peshawar Zalmi cricketers
Place of birth missing (living people)